Route 81 or Highway 81 may refer to:

International
 Asian Highway 81
 European route E81

Australia
 Escort Way (New South Wales)
 Mulligan Highway and Peninsula Developmental Road - Queensland State Route 81
 (Victoria)

Canada
 Newfoundland and Labrador Route 81

India
 National Highway 81 (India)

Korea, South
National Route 81

Mexico
 Mexican Federal Highway 81

Philippines
 N81 highway (Philippines)

United States
 Interstate 81
 Interstate 81E (former)
 Interstate 81S (former)
 U.S. Route 81
 Alabama State Route 81
 Arizona State Route 81 (former)
 Arkansas Highway 81
 California State Route 81
 Connecticut Route 81
 Florida State Road 81
 County Road 81A (Holmes County, Florida)
 Georgia State Route 81
 Idaho State Highway 81
 Illinois Route 81
 Iowa Highway 81
 Kentucky Route 81
 Louisiana Highway 81
 Louisiana State Route 81 (former)
 Maryland Route 81 (former)
 Massachusetts Route 81
 M-81 (Michigan highway)
Minnesota:
 Minnesota State Highway 81 (1934)
 Minnesota State Highway 81 (pre-1988)
 Missouri Route 81
 Montana Highway 81
 Nebraska Highway 81 (former)
 Nevada State Route 81 (former)
 New Jersey Route 81
 County Route 81 (Bergen County, New Jersey)
 New Mexico State Road 81
 New York State Route 81
 County Route 81A (Cayuga County, New York)
County Route 81C (Cayuga County, New York)
 County Route 81 (Chautauqua County, New York)
 County Route 81 (Dutchess County, New York)
 County Route 81 (Essex County, New York)
 County Route 81 (Madison County, New York)
 County Route 81 (Montgomery County, New York)
 County Route 81 (Oneida County, New York)
 County Route 81 (Rockland County, New York)
 County Route 81 (Suffolk County, New York)
 County Route 81 (Sullivan County, New York)
 North Carolina Highway 81
 Country Road 81 (Richland County, North Dakota)
 Ohio State Route 81
 Oklahoma State Highway 81A
 Pennsylvania Route 81 (former)
 Rhode Island Route 81
 South Carolina Highway 81
 South Dakota Highway 81 (former)
 Tennessee State Route 81
Tennessee State Route 81A (former)
 Texas State Highway 81
 Texas State Highway Loop 81 (former)
 Farm to Market Road 81
 Utah State Route 81
 Virginia State Route 81 (former)
 West Virginia Route 81 (1925–1941) (former)
 West Virginia Route 81 (1960–1961) (former)
 Wisconsin Highway 81

Territories
 U.S. Virgin Islands Highway 81

See also
A81